Maeu Nanai Livi is a Samoan weightlifter who has represented Samoa at the Commonwealth Youth Games and Pacific Games.

At the 2015 Commonwealth Youth Games in Apia he won gold in the 85 kg division. In June 2019 he was part of the Samoan team for the 2019 Junior World Weightlifting Championships.

At the 2019 Pacific Games in Apia he won three bronze medals in the 96 kg division, as well as silver at the 2019 Oceania Weightlifting Championships and bronze at the 2019 Commonwealth Weightlifting Championships.

References

Living people
Samoan male weightlifters
Year of birth missing (living people)